Do Androids Dream of Electric Sheep? is a 24 issue comic book limited series published by BOOM! Studios in 2009. It is an adaptation of Philip K. Dick's novel by the same name and was drawn by Tony Parker. The series was nominated for an Eisner Award in the category Best New Series.

Reception
The series holds an average rating of 7.0 by 13 professional critics on the review aggregation website Comic Book Roundup. The series received a nomination for Best New Series at the Eisner Awards.

Prints

Issues

Collected editions

"Do Androids Dream of Electric Sheep? Omnibus" by P. K. Dick, Tony Parker, Blond, Richard Starkings; 2015, 640 pages, Boom Entertainment [includes all 24 issues], ISBN 978-1608867844

"Do Androids Dream of Electric Sheep?", 6 collector's volumes of the 24 issues, 2009-2011
 Vol. 1, #1-#4, 139 pages, Nov. 2009, ISBN 978-1608865000
 Vol. 2, #5-#8, 134 pages, Feb. 2010, ISBN 978-1608865093
 Vol. 3, #9-#12, 134 pages, Aug. 2010, ISBN 978-1608865772
 Vol. 4, #13-#16, 133 pages, Feb. 2011, ISBN 978-1608866151
 Vol. 5, #17-#20, 135 pages, ISBN 978-1608866403
 Vol. 6, #21-#24, 133 pages, Oct. 2011, ISBN 978-1608866410

See also
 Works by Philip K. Dick

References

External links
 Do Androids Dream of Electric Sheep?  at the Comic Book DB
 

Boom! Studios limited series
Blade Runner (franchise)
2009 comics debuts
Comics based on novels
Cyberpunk comics
Adaptations of works by Philip K. Dick